Major-General Toby Moll  (1917-1967) was a South African Chief of Defence Staff from 1 July 1966 until his death on 30 November 1967.

Military career 
He joined the Permanent Force in 1935 and qualified as a pilot in 1936 and later became a Flight Commander at Central Flying School. He served in World War II in the Middle Eastern front.

Awards and decorations

See also
List of South African military chiefs
South African Air Force

References 

1917 births
White South African people
South African Air Force personnel of World War II
South African Air Force generals
1967 deaths
Military attachés
Companions of the Distinguished Service Order
South African military personnel of the Korean War